Frederick Groves (6 May 1892 – 1980) was an English footballer who played in the Football League for Lincoln City, Huddersfield Town, Tranmere Rovers, Crystal Palace and Stoke.

Career
Groves was born in Lincoln and began his career with his local club Lincoln City in 1909. He played seven times for the "Imps" scoring once and the played for Worksop Town, Sheffield United, Huddersfield Town and Pontypridd before joining Tranmere Rovers in 1921. He scored seven goals in 12 matches for Rovers which promoted Stoke to sign him in November 1921. He scored 12 goals for Stoke in 1921–22 helping them to gain promotion to the First Division. However Groves struggled in the top flight scoring just once in 13 matches and was released at the end of the campaign. He then spent two years with Crystal Palace and later played for Rhyl Athletic and Sutton Town.

Career statistics
Source:

References

1892 births
1980 deaths
English footballers
Sportspeople from Lincoln, England
Association football forwards
Lincoln City F.C. players
Worksop Town F.C. players
Sheffield United F.C. players
Huddersfield Town A.F.C. players
Pontypridd F.C. players
Tranmere Rovers F.C. players
Stoke City F.C. players
Crystal Palace F.C. players
Rhyl F.C. players
Ashfield United F.C. players
English Football League players